The county governor of Troms og Finnmark county in Norway represents the central government administration in the county.

Troms og Finnmark county was created on 1 January 2020 when the old Troms and Finnmark counties were merged. The county governor offices of Troms and Finnmark counties were merged on 1 January 2019 in anticipation of the merger of the two counties. 

The county governor is the government's representative in the county. The governor carries out the resolutions and guidelines of the Storting and government. This is done first by the county governor performing administrative tasks on behalf of the ministries. Secondly, the county governor also monitors the activities of the municipalities and is the appeal body for many types of municipal decisions.

Names
The title of the office was originally  but on 1 January 2021, the title was changed to the gender-neutral .

List of county governors
Troms og Finnmark has had the following governors:

See also
For the county governors of this area before 2018, see:
List of county governors of Troms
List of county governors of Finnmark

References

Troms og Finnmark
County governor